Fyodor Mikhaylovich Smolov (born 9 February 1990) is a Russian professional footballer who plays as a striker for Dynamo Moscow and the Russian national team.

Club career
Smolov is a graduate of the Master-Saturn Yegoryevsk football academy. In 2007, he joined Dynamo Moscow. He made his Russian Premier League debut for Dynamo on 28 April 2007 in a game against FC Luch-Energiya Vladivostok, at the age of 17, as a last-minute substitute for Cícero. Despite scoring prolifically for the national junior teams and Dynamo's own Under-21 squad, he only scored one goal for the senior team in the next 3.5 seasons and only started in 11 games up to that point. On 14 July 2010, the club announced that Smolov would join Feyenoord on a one-year loan deal.
Returning from loan, Smolov started 2011–12 season as a squad player, but after 9 matchdays his impact was limited to substitute appearances. So he was loaned again, this time to Anzhi Makhachkala - initially for whole 2012–13 season, and then for the second part of 2013–14 season.

Loan to Ural
On 1 September 2014, Smolov joined Ural Yekaterinburg on a season-long loan deal. Two weeks later, on his new club debut, he scored a goal in a 1–2 away loss to Amkar Perm. He  provided 8 goals and 2 assists in 22 league appearances for Ural.

Krasnodar
On 2 June 2015, Smolov signed a four-year contract with the Russian Premier League club Krasnodar as a free agent. He made his competitive debut for his new club in a 1–0 away victory over Amkar Perm in his first league match on 20 July 2015, and scored his first goal in a 3–3 draw against Slovan Bratislava in the UEFA Europa League third qualifying round on 6 August.

On 10 April 2016, Smolov scored four goals in Krasnodar's 6–0 victory over his former club Ural Yekaterinburg. With 20 goals in 29 games, he became the top scorer of the 2015–16 Russian Premier League season, and he is the first Krasnodar player who achieved this title. He repeated as top scorer in the 2016–17 Russian Premier League, scoring 18 times. In the 2017–18 Russian Premier League, he came in second with 14 goals to Quincy Promes' 15.

Lokomotiv Moscow
On 9 August 2018, he joined the Russian Premier League champion FC Lokomotiv Moscow.

Loan to Celta
On 30 January 2020, he joined Spanish club Celta Vigo on loan until the end of the 2019–20 season. He scored his first goal for the new club on 16 February 2020 at Santiago Bernabéu Stadium against Real Madrid in a 2–2 away draw. Smolov scored the second goal of his loan spell in a 2–2 draw with Barcelona on 27 June.

Return to Lokomotiv
On 12 May 2021, he scored the go-ahead goal in the 2021 Russian Cup Final against Krylia Sovetov. He won his third trophy at Lokomotiv and also became the tournament's joint-top scorer with 4 goals, along with teammate François Kamano.

Return to Dynamo
On 12 January 2022, Dynamo announced the signing of Fyodor from Lokomotiv, making him return to the first club in his professional career. Also the Moscow club disclosed that the term of the contract is 1.5 years plus an additional optional year. On 26 February 2022, in his first competitive game back with Dynamo, he scored the opening goal of the 3–0 victory over FC Khimki, 11 years after he last scored for Dynamo.

International career
Smolov was part of the Russia Under-21 side that was competing in the 2011 European Under-21 Championship qualification. He was an important factor in the U-21 team qualifying for the 2013 UEFA European Under-21 Football Championship in the next cycle, scoring three goals in the qualification play-offs against the Czech Republic.

On 6 November 2012, Russia manager Fabio Capello included Smolov in the squad for a friendly game against the United States. During the game, he made his debut and scored his first goal for the national team, netting the opener in a 2–2 home draw on 14 November.

Smolov scored his first competitive goal for the national team in a 7–0 away victory against Liechtenstein in a Euro 2016 qualifier on 8 September 2015. He was subsequently included in Russia's squad for the final tournament in France, where he started in all three matches as Russia finished 4th in group B.

In the opening match of the 2017 FIFA Confederations Cup against New Zealand on 17 June at Krestovsky Stadium, Smolov scored Russia's second goal in a 2–0 win and was Man of the Match.

On 3 June 2018, he was included in the finalized World Cup squad. He started the tournament-opener game against Saudi Arabia and appeared as a substitute in every subsequent game. He scored the opening penalty kick in the shoot-out that helped Russia defeat Spain in the Round of 16, but had his shot saved by Danijel Subašić in the quarterfinal shoot-out which Russia lost to Croatia.

On 11 May 2021, he was named as a back-up player for Russia's UEFA Euro 2020 squad.

Personal life
Smolov is fluent in English and has read Mario Puzo's books in the original language. From 2012, he was in a relationship with Russian model and TV hostess Victoria Lopyreva. The couple got married in December 2013 but then divorced in May 2015. He has supported AC Milan since the 1997–98 season and once cited George Weah and Andriy Shevchenko as his childhood favorite players. On 1 August 2018, Smolov crashed his BMW M5 into a traffic barrier in Krasnodar. He was later fined and had his driver's license suspended for one year for leaving the scene of the accident. On April 5, 2020 Smolov broke Spain's coronavirus protocols to return to Russia to celebrate the 18th birthday of his fiancee Maria Yumasheva, the granddaughter of Boris Yeltsin.

He is the first Russian footballer to speak out against the war in Ukraine following the invasion by Russia on 24 February 2022.

Career statistics

Club

International

Scores and results list Russia's goal tally first.

Honours
Lokomotiv Moscow
 Russian Cup: 2018–19, 2020–21
 Russian Super Cup: 2019

Individual
 Russian Premier League top goalscorer: 2015–16, 2016–17
 Footballer of the Year in Russia (Sport-Express): 2015–16, 2016–17, 2017–18

References

External links

1990 births
Sportspeople from Saratov
Living people
FC Dynamo Moscow players
Russian footballers
Russia international footballers
Russia youth international footballers
Russia under-21 international footballers
Russian Premier League players
Feyenoord players
Expatriate footballers in the Netherlands
Russian expatriate sportspeople in the Netherlands
Russian expatriate footballers
Eredivisie players
FC Anzhi Makhachkala players
FC Ural Yekaterinburg players
FC Krasnodar players
FC Lokomotiv Moscow players
RC Celta de Vigo players
Expatriate footballers in Spain
Association football wingers
Association football forwards
UEFA Euro 2016 players
2017 FIFA Confederations Cup players
2018 FIFA World Cup players
Russian activists against the 2022 Russian invasion of Ukraine